The Andrew Berg Cabin near Soldotna, Alaska was built by fisherman and trapper Andrew Berg in 1902.  It was listed on the National Register of Historic Places in 2000.

It is a one-room, one-and-a-half-story single pen log cabin built of spruce logs, with sill logs laid on the ground.

Andrew Berg built a total of 11 log cabins on the Kenai Peninsula. He built his first, which served as his home, in 1902 on Tustumena Lake. Berg used spruce logs to construct the home cabin, which measures 17 feet wide by 17 feet long. Also in the Refuge is Berg's last cabin, built in 1935, also on Tustumena Lake. In 2000 the cabin was disassembled and moved next to the Refuge's visitor center. The 1935 cabin is open to the public.

See also
National Register of Historic Places listings in Kenai Peninsula Borough, Alaska

References

Buildings and structures on the National Register of Historic Places in Kenai Peninsula Borough, Alaska
National Register of Historic Places in Kenai Peninsula Borough, Alaska
Houses completed in 1902
1902 establishments in Alaska